Waits is a surname. Notable people with the surname include:

 Freddie Waits (1943–1989), American musician
 Nasheet Waits (born 1971), American jazz drummer
 Rick Waits (born 1952), American baseball player
 Tom Waits (born 1949), American singer
 Gregory Waits (born 1956), American composer, musician